Dahil Mahal na Mahal Kita is a 1998 Filipino drama romance film directed by Wenn V. Deramas under Star Cinema, starring Claudine Barretto, Rico Yan and Diether Ocampo as mainstay protagonists in Mula sa Puso along with co-star and supporting casts Jaclyn Jose and Princess Punzalan. The film received a grade of  "A" by the Cinema Evaluation Board.

Plot

Mela (Claudine Barretto) is a campus beauty who's earned the reputation of a “Bad Girl.” But underneath the seductive clothing and uninhibited behavior is a sensitive and vulnerable soul. Mela hides a painful past. Her mother died at a young age, leaving her father desolate and driving him to alcoholism. Numerous beatings from her father caused Mela to run away from home, and seek shelter with an aunt. Despite living an immoral life as a mistress, Mela's aunt is kind-hearted and loving to her niece. Mela herself constantly seeks acceptance and satisfaction in relationships with different men.

Mela's current boyfriend, Ryan (Diether Ocampo), is also a troubled soul who cannot get along with his father. The youngest and the only boy among three children, Ryan's source of emotional support is his mother. Mela and Ryan start off as friends before going steady, but it is not long before Ryan becomes unfaithful.

Hurt and determined to change her destiny, Mela resolves to look for “Mr. Perfect,” who turns out to be Miguel (Rico Yan). Rich, intelligent, and good-mannered. A typical aristocrat guy who is always formal, all-business and snobbish. He portrays the typical “guy-next-door” women fall for, but has a superior personality which is a turn-off. Miguel's only fault is his tendency to rigid self-discipline. Besides being a member of the school's discipline committee, Miguel also helps manage the family business. Miguel's father died while he was young, and his mother was left to raise him and his brother. His brother also died, suffering a broken heart from a relationship with an immoral wife.

Mela sets her sights on Miguel, but Miguel refuses to give her the time of day. Mela is relentless, and dares Miguel to a bet, the consequence being, he would have to spend a weekend with Mela. Miguel loses, and, despite his fears, enjoys the company of Mela. During their weekend together, Miguel discovers the beauty in Mela, and falls hopelessly in love.

Love eventually transforms Mela into the person who would please Miguel. But the story doesn't end there. The relationship must strive through jealousy, misunderstanding and animosity from Miguel's mother.

Cast and characters

Claudine Barretto as Carmela "Mela" Ocampo
Rico Yan as Miguel Quirino
Diether Ocampo as Ryan	
Jaclyn Jose as Tita Myrna
Isabel Rivas as Mrs. Suzanne Quirino
Jan Marini as Jam 
Lailani Navarro as Cory
Marita Zobel as Ryan's Mother
Lito Legaspi as Ryan's Father
Farrah Florer as Miguel's Sister in Law
Donnie Fernandez as Manny
Lui Villaruz as Bobby 
CJ Tolentino as Paolo
Princess Punzalan as School Dean (Special Participation)

Potential remake
In 2017, Viva Entertainment reportedly planned to produce a remake of Dahil Mahal Na Mahal Kita which would star Julia Barretto (Claudine's real-life niece) and Joshua Garcia.

References

External links
  (Star Cinema)
 

1998 films
Philippine romantic drama films
Tagalog-language films
Star Cinema films
Films directed by Wenn V. Deramas
Films shot in Manila
Films shot in Cavite
1990s English-language films